Glangwili General Hospital, previously known as West Wales General Hospital, is a general hospital in Carmarthen, Wales. It is managed by Hywel Dda University Health Board.

History
The hospital opened as the West Wales General Hospital in 1949. It changed its name to Glangwili General Hospital following a vote in 2010.

In September 2014 a new renal dialysis unit run by Fresenius Medical Care Renal Services Ltd was opened at the hospital, with a contract to run for at least seven years. As part of the reorganisation of acute services in Wales a full-time inpatient paediatric service was provided at Glangwili from October 2014.

References

External links
Glangwili General Hospital

NHS hospitals in Wales
Carmarthen
Hospitals in Carmarthenshire
Hospital buildings completed in 1949
Hospitals established in 1949
1949 establishments in Wales
Hywel Dda University Health Board